Chiaromonte is a town and comune in the province of Potenza, in the Southern Italian region of Basilicata. Under the pseudonym "Montegrano", it was the case study for Edward C. Banfield's The Moral Basis of a Backward Society.

References

Cities and towns in Basilicata